Penman is a surname. 

From the Surnames of Scotland by George F.Black
Of local origin from a small place of the name formally in Roxburghshire or Selkirkshire. 
Chalmers (ii p.971) records a Penmanscore formally near Minchmoor, and there is a Penmanshiel in Berwickshire, 
near Cockburnspath.
Penman, for Old British Penmaen, is rendered 'head of (the) stone' (Watson i, p354).
A pavement was made to Jhon Peneman in 1606 (RRM., i p.17), Andrew Penman is recorded in Edmistoun, parish of Biggar in 1638 (Lanark), Andrew Penman in Melrose in 1662 (RRM., i p5), and Janet Penman in Lauder, 1654 (Lauder).
The Reverend Gideon Penman, 'sometime a minister,' was accused in 1678 of being chaplain to the Devil (RPC,. 3, ser.v. p.494).
William Penman was a writer in Edinburgh in 1672 (Edinb. Marr), and John Penman is recorded in Winding-toun-rigg in 1688 (Peebles CR). 
The names of Agnes Pennane and Issobell Pennane, tenents on the lands of the Abbey of Kelso, 1567 (Kelso, p. 536) are probably but another spelling.

Penman refers to:
Andy Penman (1943–1994), Scottish professional football player
David John Penman (1936–1989), Australian Anglican archbishop
Ian Penman (contemporary), British radio and television writer
Ian Penman (born 1959), British writer and blogger
Nelia Penman (1915–2017), British politician
Percival Penman (1885–1944), Australian cricketer
 Robert Penman (fl. 1920s/30s), Scottish footballer
Sharon Kay Penman (born 1945), American historical novelist

Penman, or Penmen may also refer to:
a practitioner of penmanship
a scribe
a craftsman of calligraphy
another term for a writer, journalist, or author
Southern New Hampshire Penmen, the athletic teams of Southern New Hampshire University